The Pließnitz  is a river of Saxony, Germany. It is a right tributary of the Lusatian Neisse, which it joins near Görlitz.

See also
List of rivers of Saxony

References

Rivers of Saxony
Rivers of Germany